Oflag XII-B was a German World War II prisoner-of-war camp for officers (Offizierlager) located in the citadel of Mainz, in western Germany. The fortress had also served as an Oflag in World War I.

Camp history
In June 1940 British, Belgian, Dutch and French senior officers and a small number of orderlies were transported to Mainz from transit camps in France and Belgium after the end of the Battle of France. In June 1942, all inmates were transferred to Oflag XII-A in Hadamar, near Limburg, which was then renumbered Oflag XII-B.

Notable prisoners
 Sylvain Eugène Raynal (World War I)
 Salomon Gluck (World War II)
 Fernand Braudel (World War II)
 André Clayeux (World War II)
 André Schulmann (World War II)
 Paul-Louis Roche (World War II)
 Jean-Louis Morvan (World War II)
 Edward Ward, 7th Viscount Bangor (World War II)

See also
 Oflag
 List of prisoner-of-war camps in Germany

References

External links
 World War I British officer in Mainz Citadel

Oflags